A submarine base is a military base that shelters submarines and their personnel.

Examples of present-day submarine bases include HMNB Clyde, Île Longue (the base for France's Force océanique stratégique), Naval Submarine Base Kings Bay, Naval Submarine Base New London, and Rybachiy Nuclear Submarine Base (near Petropavlovsk-Kamchatsky).

INS Vajrabahu and INS Satavahana are the submarine bases of the Indian Navy. A new underground submarine base, INS Varsha is under construction near Vishakhapatnam for the new expanding fleet of Indian nuclear submarines. 

The Israeli navy bases its growing submarine force in Haifa.

Former submarine bases include DORA 1, Naval Submarine Base Bangor (now part of Naval Base Kitsap), Mare Island Naval Shipyard (a nuclear-capable base), Ordnance Island in Bermuda during World War II, and the formerly-classified Soviet base at Balaklava in the now Autonomous Republic of Crimea.

However, the United States Navy claims Naval Submarine Base New London was the Navy's first submarine base, having been so designated in 1916.

See also
 Submarine pen
 List of countries operating submarines
 United States Navy submarine bases
 Shore facility
 Airbase
 Loss of Strength Gradient

Gallery

References

External links
German submarine bases in France (World War II)
Russian submarine base in Crimea